The Fifty Worst Films of All Time (and How They Got That Way) is a 1978 book by Harry Medved with Randy Dreyfuss. It presents the authors' choices for the 50 worst sound films ever made. Each film's entry includes a story synopsis, the authors' opinions of its quality, and a selection of contemporary reviews of the film.

Categories
In compiling their list, the authors divided films into several categories: 
"Popular Triumphs" like The Omen, Valley of the Dolls 
"Overrated Art Films" like Ivan the Terrible, Last Year at Marienbad 
"Implausible Oddities" like The Terror of Tiny Town
"Big Budget Flops" like Lost Horizon, Zabriskie Point 
"Grade-Z Atrocities" like Robot Monster, Eegah 
"Tarnished Stars" such as Yul Brynner in Solomon and Sheba 
"Oldies but Baddies" like Jamaica Inn

Subcategories
The authors also used egregious examples to represent less reputable film genres, such as blaxploitation films (Trouble Man), Japanese monster movies (Godzilla vs. Hedorah), Spaghetti Westerns (Return of Sabata) and jungle movies (Daughter of the Jungle) alongside anime (Alakazam the Great), disaster movies (Airport 1975), sexploitation films (Myra Breckinridge), Elvis Presley vehicles (Spinout), and mainstream films like At Long Last Love, Bring Me the Head of Alfredo Garcia, Hurry Sundown, King Richard and the Crusaders, Say One for Me.

Criteria
The book intentionally excludes silent films because the authors consider them to be "a separate and unique art form and that judging them alongside talkies would be like weighing apples together with oranges." It limits the foreign films considered to only those distributed in the United States, judging it unfair to evaluate local obscurities denied an international release alongside mainstream Hollywood products while realizing that it would not only be difficult for the authors to view the films, but unlikely that any readers would ever come across them.

From the book's many factual errors, it's clear that the authors did little or no original research or their reviews were based on poor quality edited copies which were the only ones available at the time, such as with Jamaica Inn.

Reception
Despite the popularity of the book among some members of the general public, film scholars and historians largely excoriated the book for its lack of understanding and perspective.  Acclaimed film historian William K. Everson wrote a scathing review in Films in Review:  "There are so many factual errors and sweepingly inaccurate generalizations that to list them all would take a volume of the same size.... The authors of the book are both teen-agers. This is hardly their fault.
And some often remarkable writing has been done by teen-agers. But NOT in any field of historical research, where experience and the perspective that
can ONLY come about by years in a chosen field, are absolute essentials.... If nothing else, The 50 Worst Movies Of All Time unquestionably qualifies as The Worst Movie Book Of All Time - and in view of the mediocrity being spewed forth these days, that in
itself is a monumental achievement." Critic Hal Erickson wrote, "How easy it is to tear something down. A child of four can do it."

Legacy
The Medveds continued the theme of "celebrating" bad cinema with the publication The Golden Turkey Awards, instituted in 1980 which again showcased bad and obscure films, and The Hollywood Hall of Shame which examined in some detail several major Hollywood financial disasters, focusing on both the artistic treatments coupled with the technical and organizational ineptitude in the mounting of these films.

It has been said that The Fifty Worst Films of All Time marked the beginning of an explosion of "worst in cinema" prizes nearly resulting in "a state of redundancy almost approaching that of ordinary prizes."

The films

See also 
 List of films considered the worst
 Cult film
 B movie
 Mystery Science Theater 3000
 Golden Raspberry Awards

References

Further reading
 Medved, Harry, and Randy Dreyfuss. The Fifty Worst Films of All Time (and How They Got That Way). 1978, Warner Books.  .
 Medved, Harry, and Randy Dreyfuss. The Fifty Worst Films of All Time (and How They Got That Way). 1978 (1980 Reprint), Australia: Angus & Robertson Publishers,   (cased edition), 0 207 95892 0 (limp edition).
 Medved, Michael. The Fifty Worst Films of All Time. 1980.  .

External links
The list of films on Letterboxd

1978 non-fiction books
Books about film
Books by Michael Medved
English-language books
Lists of worsts
Cult following
Film and video fandom